These are the Official Charts Company's UK Dance Chart number-one albums of 2006. The dates listed in the menus below represent the Saturday after the Sunday the chart was announced, as per the way the dates are given in chart publications such as the ones produced by Billboard, Guinness, and Virgin.

Chart history

See also
List of number-one albums of 2006 (UK)
List of UK Dance Chart number-one singles of 2006
List of UK R&B Chart number-one albums of 2006

References

External links
Dance Albums Chart at the Official Charts Company
UK Top 40 Dance Album Chart at BBC Radio 1

2006
Number-one dance albums
United Kingdom Dance Albums